Mahfil may refer to: 
 Müezzin mahfili (Turkish), a special raised platform in a mosque, opposite the minbar, where a muezzin kneels and chants in response to the imam's prayers
 Mehfil or mahfil (Urdu), a gathering or evening of courtly entertainment of poetry, performed for a small audience in an intimate setting